Pterolophia arabica is a species of beetle in the family Cerambycidae. It was described by Pierre Téocchi in 1992.

References

arabica
Beetles described in 1992